Kara is a rural locality (a selo) in Laksky District, Republic of Dagestan, Russia. The population was 529 as of 2010. There are 9 streets.

Geography 
Kara is located 26 km northeast of Kumukh (the district's administrative centre) by road. Kundy and Kuma are the nearest rural localities.

Nationalities 
Laks live there.

References 

Rural localities in Laksky District